Gorenji Logatec (locally also Gornji Logatec, formerly Cerkovska vas; , formerly Kirchdorf) is a former village in western Slovenia in the Municipality of Logatec. It is now part of the town of Logatec. It is part of the traditional region of Inner Carniola and is now included in the Central Slovenia Statistical Region.

Geography
Gorenji Logatec is located in the western part of the Logatec Karst Field along the main road from Vrhnika to Kalce. It stands in a narror valley, with Big Bukve Hill rising to the north and Sekirica Hill to the east. The confluence of Black Creek and Reka Creek in the center of the village creates the start of the Logaščica River. There is a gravel pit in the hamlet of Klanec to the north, and the hamlet of Reka stands along Reka Creek.

Name
The name Gorenji Logatec means 'upper Logatec', contrasting with neighboring Dolenji Logatec (literally, 'lower Logatec'). Around the middle of the 18th century, the area around Our Lady of the Rosary Church started being known as Cerkovska vas (literally, 'church village'), with the German equivalent Kirchdorf. The name Cerkovska vas was replaced by Gorenji Logatec by the late 19th century.

History
Together with neighboring Brod, Gorenji Logatec was destroyed by a fire on August 8, 1876. Gorenji Logatec had a population of 452 (in 54 houses) in 1880, 482 (in 60 houses) in 1900, and 426 (in 77 houses) in 1931. Gorenji Logatec was annexed by Logatec in 1972, ending its existence as a separate settlement.

Churches

There are two churches in Gorenji Logatec. Our Lady of the Rosary Church is the parish church; it dates from 1754 and stands in the center of the former village. Holy Cross Church stands north of the village center, on the southern slope of Tabor Hill. It is the oldest church in Logatec; it dates from the 16th century and was remodeled in 1765.

Logatec Castle

Logatec Castle stands across the main road, southwest of the settlement. It replaced an older castle that stood near Holy Cross Church on Tabor Hill and was already in ruins by the 17th century. The castle was originally the seat of the Dominion of Logatec and was then owned by the Windisch-Graetz family until 1848, when it became the property of the local administration. It was used as offices until 1932, and the local court was housed in it from 1906 to 1945. After the Second World War, it served as a boys' school until 1966. It is now used as residential apartments.

Notable people
Notable people that were born or lived in Gorenji Logatec include:
 (1881–1912), geographer and speleologist
 (1799–1857), religious writer and lexicographer
 (1874–1915), organ manucaturer
 (1893–1973), architect
 (1914–2005), lawyer and pedagogue
Vladimir Travner (1886–1940), historian
 (1844–1922), lawyer and notary

References

External links

Gorenji Logatec on Geopedia

Populated places in the Municipality of Logatec
Former settlements in Slovenia